The following is a list of the 25 cantons of the Hérault department, in France, following the French canton reorganisation which came into effect in March 2015:

 Agde
 Béziers-1
 Béziers-2
 Béziers-3
 Cazouls-lès-Béziers
 Clermont-l'Hérault
 Le Crès
 Frontignan
 Gignac
 Lattes
 Lodève
 Lunel
 Mauguio
 Mèze
 Montpellier-1
 Montpellier-2
 Montpellier-3
 Montpellier-4
 Montpellier-5
 Montpellier - Castelnau-le-Lez
 Pézenas
 Pignan
 Saint-Gély-du-Fesc
 Saint-Pons-de-Thomières
 Sète

References